The men's high jump event at the 2009 Summer Universiade was held on 7–9 July.

Medalists

Results

Qualification
Qualification: 2.23 m (Q) or at least 12 best (q) qualified for the final.

Final

References
Results (archived)

High
2009